Marin Elizabeth Hinkle (born March 23, 1966) is an American actress. Among many television and movie roles, she is best known for playing Judy Brooks on the ABC television drama Once and Again, Judith Harper-Melnick on the CBS sitcom Two and a Half Men, and Rose Weissman on the comedy-drama series The Marvelous Mrs. Maisel on Amazon Prime Video. For her role in The Marvelous Mrs. Maisel, Hinkle was nominated for the Primetime Emmy Award for Outstanding Supporting Actress in a Comedy Series in 2019 and 2020.

Early life
Hinkle was born in Dar es Salaam, Tanzania, to American parents. She is the daughter of Margaret R. (Polga) Hinkle, a judge of the Superior Court of Massachusetts, and Rodney Hinkle, a college dean and teacher, who met while serving in the Peace Corps. Her family moved to Boston, Massachusetts, when she was four months old. Two years later, her brother Mark was born. After graduating from Newton South High School, she attended Brown University and New York University's Graduate Acting Program at the Tisch School of the Arts, graduating in 1991.

Career
Hinkle played Juliet in Romeo and Juliet, opposite Jean Stapleton playing the Nurse, at the Shakespeare Theatre Company in Washington DC from January 25 to March 13, 1994, at the Lansburgh Theatre in Washington DC. On Broadway, she played Kuroko and was the understudy for Miranda in The Tempest from November 1 to December 31, 1995, at the Broadhurst Theatre. She played Sandra Markowitz in A Thousand Clowns from July 14 to August 10, 1996, at the Criterion Center Stage Right. She also played Chrysothemis in Electra from December 3, 1998, to March 21, 1999, at the Ethel Barrymore Theatre. Hinkle started her TV career on the soap opera Another World. She also portrayed Judy Brooks on ABC's drama series Once and Again from 1999 to 2002. Hinkle starred on the CBS sitcom Two and a Half Men with Charlie Sheen, Jon Cryer, Angus T. Jones, and later Ashton Kutcher as Alan's neurotic ex-wife, Judith. Despite being a main cast member, she rarely made appearances after the show's eighth season. She was quietly phased out of the series, and her last appearances as a regular were in the ninth season of the series. She made only one appearance each in the last three seasons, though she was still credited as a regular. This may have been due to commitments to her new role as Samantha Bowers in the NBC drama series Deception with Tate Donovan, Victor Garber and Katherine LaNasa.

Hinkle has had roles in films such as I'm Not Rappaport, Frequency, The Next Big Thing, I Am Sam, and Dark Blue. She has also performed on stage in 2005 as the titular character in Miss Julie, opposite Reg Rogers. She appeared in the 2008 thrillers Quarantine and The Haunting of Molly Hartley, and has made guest appearances on shows such as Spin City, Law & Order: SVU, Without a Trace, ER, House, and twice as characters on Law & Order.

Filmography

Film

Television

References

External links

 
 

1966 births
20th-century American actresses
21st-century American actresses
Actresses from Boston
American film actresses
American soap opera actresses
American television actresses
Brown University alumni
Living people
Newton South High School alumni
American expatriates in Tanzania
Tisch School of the Arts alumni